The 2017–18 Asian Le Mans Series was the sixth season of the Automobile Club de l'Ouest's Asian Le Mans Series. It is the fourth 24 Hours of Le Mans-based series created by the ACO, following the American Le Mans Series (since merged with the Rolex Sports Car Series to form the United SportsCar Championship), the European Le Mans Series and the FIA World Endurance Championship. The season began at the Zhuhai International Circuit in October 2017 and ended at Sepang International Circuit in Selangor on 4 February 2018.

Calendar
The 2017–2018 calendar was revealed in February 2017. It was then updated in June, removing the Zhejiang round.

Entry list

LMP2

LMP3

GT and GT Cup

Results
Bold indicates overall winner.

Teams championships
Points are awarded according to the following structure:

LMP2 Teams Championship

LMP3 Teams Championship

GT Teams Championship

GT Am Teams Championship

GTC Teams Championship

Drivers championships
Points are awarded according to the following structure:

LMP2 Drivers Championship

LMP3 Drivers Championship

GT Drivers Championship

GT Am Drivers Championship

GTC Drivers Championship

References

External links
 

Asian Le Mans Series seasons
Asian Le Mans Series
Asian Le Mans Series
Le Mans Series
Le Mans Series